Heather Fuhr (born January 19, 1968 in Edmonton, Alberta) is a female triathlete from Canada, considered one of the best women runners in triathlon. Fuhr was the Ironman Triathlon World Champion in 1997.  Among her other victories are winning Ironman USA in 1999, 2001–2003 and 2005.  She is married to Roch Frey. Fuhr starred in the documentary What It Takes which was released in 2006.

External links
Documentary featuring Heather Fuhr

1968 births
Living people
Canadian people of German descent
Canadian female triathletes
Ironman world champions
Sportspeople from Edmonton